Inarticulate Nature Boy is the debut solo album by American rock musician Josh Clayton-Felt. It was released on May 19, 1996 through A&M Records.

Background and recording
After the break-up of his group School of Fish, singer-guitarist Clayton-Felt began learning to play keyboards, bass, and drums in addition to guitar. He began recording 25 songs over the next few years. Although his friend and former bandmate Michael Ward added some guitar tracks, and he had a little help on percussion, Clayton-Felt for the most part played all the other instruments off this album.  The track "Window" reached #49 on Radio & Records' Alternative chart.

Critical reception
Critic Roch Pariesien gave the album three out of five stars, calling it "more casual, relaxed, and eccentric" than Clayton-Felt's work in School of Fish. Pariesien concludes his review by lumping Clayton-Felt "into a loose class of former-band-frontman solo artists" such as Michael Been of The Call and Ian McNabb of The Icicle Works. However, he adds, "If anyone out there, just to prove me wrong, chooses to start a campaign to make Nature Boy a huge hit rather than a tiny cult phenomenon, please let me know so I can be first in line to buy a second copy."

Track listing
All tracks written by Josh Clayton-Felt. The album's track listing can be obtained from Allmusic.

References

1996 debut albums
Josh Clayton-Felt albums
A&M Records albums